Gromov is a Russian male surname, its feminine counterpart is Gromova (Громова). 

Gromov may refer to:
Alexander Georgiyevich Gromov (born 1947), Russian politician and KGB officer
Alexander Gromov (born 1959), Russian science fiction writer
Alexey Gromov (born 1960), Russian politician
Boris Gromov (born 1943), Soviet general, military commander in Afghanistan and Governor of Moscow Oblast
 Dmitri Gromov (figure skater) (born 1967), Russian figure skater 
 Dmitri Gromov (ice hockey) (born 1991), Russian ice hockey player
Feliks Gromov  (1937–2021), Russian admiral, commander in chief Russian Navy (1992–1997)
Kirill Gromov (born 1990), Russian ice hockey defenceman
Maxim Gromov (born 1973), Russian political dissident
Mikhail Leonidovich Gromov (born 1943), French-Russian mathematician
Mikhail Gromov (aviator) (1899–1985), Russian aviator
Nikolai Gromov (1892–1943), Russian football player
Valeri Gromov (born 1980), Russian football player

Gromova may refer to:

 Lyudmila Gromova (born 1942), Russian artistic gymnast 
 Mariya Gromova (born 1984), Russian synchronized swimmer
 Maria Gromova (swimmer) (born 1988), Russian backstroke and relay swimmer
 Serafima Gromova (1923–2013), engineer, Hero of Socialist Labour
 Ulyana Gromova (1924–1943), Hero of the Soviet Union
 Vera Gromova (1891–1973), Russian paleontologist
 Zhanna Gromova (born 1949), Russian figure skating coach

Russian-language surnames